Goth Mewa Khan Lehri is a village in the Jaffarabad District of Balochistan Province, Pakistan. The village is near the city of Usta Mohammad.

Populated places in Jafarabad District